Santa Teresa is a district of San Jose, California, United States, located in South San Jose. Founded in 1834, Santa Teresa was originally established as Rancho Santa Teresa by the Bernal family, a prominent Californio clan. Today, Santa Teresa is largely a residential area, but also home to numerous Silicon Valley tech campuses.

Santa Teresa is the southernmost urban district of San Jose, bordering the largely protected Coyote Valley to its south. It is bound by the Santa Teresa Hills to its west and the Bayshore Freeway (101) to its east.

History

Santa Teresa was founded in 1834 as Rancho Santa Teresa, a rancho grant given by Governor José Figueroa to Don José Joaquín Bernal, a retired soldier who came to Alta California as part of the De Anza Expedition in 1776. Prior to receiving the rancho grant, José Joaquín Bernal had already settled in the area since 1826. Bernal named the area Santa Teresa after attributing the healing waters of the Santa Teresa Spring to Saint Teresa of Ávila, the 16th century Spanish saint. Rancho Santa Teresa quickly became an important center for Californio life in the southern Santa Clara Valley, attracting vaqueros and their families from the region with regular fiestas featuring Fandango dancing and large feasts.

Following the death of Don José Joaquín, his second son, Don Bruno Bernal, takes over the rancho's administration, while his two brothers, Agustín and Juan Pablo, sought businesses ventures outside of Santa Teresa. By the time of the California Gold Rush, Agustín and Juan Pablo were selling their cattle to miners in Gold Country, while Bruno managed affairs at home. Don Bruno became one of the region's most prominent public figures and ran the rancho until his death in 1863. Today, a part of the original rancho is preserved as the Rancho Santa Teresa Historic District, though the original adobe hacienda of the rancho has since burned down.

The Treaty of Santa Teresa was signed at the rancho in 1844, temporarily ending the hostilities between Governor Manuel Micheltorena and the revolters led by former Governor Juan Bautista Alvarado.

RAMAC Park is named after the IBM 305 RAMAC, the first computer to use a disk drive, which was developed at the IBM Santa Teresa Lab in the 1950s.

Geography

Santa Teresa is located in South San Jose. It is separated in the west from Almaden Valley by the Santa Teresa Hills and located north of Coyote Valley, which separates Santa Teresa from the Madrone neighborhood of Morgan Hill. To the northeast of Santa Teresa is Edenvale and to the northwest is Blossom Valley.

Tulare Hill serves as the barrier between the southern tip of Santa Teresa and Coyote Valley.

It is made up of the ZIP Codes of 95119, 95139, 95193, 95123, and the parts of 95138 that are west of Coyote Creek.

The Cottle Transit Village is a semi-urban district of Santa Teresa located in the northern-central portion of the district.

Parks and plazas

Santa Teresa County Park
Palmia Park
Los Paseos Park
George Page Park
Ramac Park
Raleigh Linear Park
Avenida España Park
Black Mountain Bowmen

Education

Santa Teresa is mostly served by the Oak Grove School District, which includes:
Taylor Elementary School
Santa Teresa Elementary School
Bernal Intermediate School
Santa Teresa High School

The southernmost portions of Santa Teresa are served by the Morgan Hill Unified School District, which operates two schools in Santa Teresa:
 Los Paseos Elementary School
 Martin Murphy Middle School

Transportation

Santa Teresa is served by three stations of the VTA light rail.
Cottle station on Cottle Rd (central Santa Teresa)
Santa Teresa station on Santa Teresa Blvd (southern Santa Teresa)
Snell station on Snell Rd (serving both western Santa Teresa and Blossom Valley)

Landmarks
Kaiser San Jose Medical Center
Santa Teresa County Park
Rancho Santa Teresa Historic District

Popular culture
Santa Teresa is the home of Kinsey Millhone in Sue Grafton's "Alphabet" series of detective novels.

Gallery

References

External links

 City of San Jose Neighborhood Boundaries Map

Neighborhoods in San Jose, California